The medley relay events at the 2022 World Para Swimming Championships will be held at the Penteada Olympic Swimming Complex in Madeira between 12–18 June.

Medalists

Results
Final
Eight nations took part.

References

2022 World Para Swimming Championships